Galgatay is a rural locality (an ulus) in Kurumkansky District, Republic of Buryatia, Russia. The population was 27 as of 2010.

Geography 
Galgatay is located 18 km south of Kurumkan (the district's administrative centre) by road. Baragkhan is the nearest rural locality.

References 

Rural localities in Kurumkansky District